Groen (English: Green;), founded as Agalev (see Name below), is a green Flemish political party in Belgium. Its French-speaking equivalent is Ecolo; the two parties maintain close relations with each other.

Party history

Before 1979
Many of the founders of political party Agalev came from or were inspired by the social movement Agalev. This movement was founded by the Jesuit Luc Versteylen, who had founded the environmental movement Agalev in the 1970s. Core values of this social movement were quiet, solidarity and soberness. This movement combined progressive Catholicism with environmentalism. It sought to spread environmental consciousness first on a small scale, but since 1973 it took action to protect the environment and promote environmental consciousness. In the 1974 and 1977 elections Agalev supported several candidates from traditional parties, these however soon forgot the promises they made. In 1977 the movement entered the elections in several municipalities not to gain seats, but to promote its ideals.

1979–1999
In reaction to these broken promises, a debate erupted within Agalev on whether to set up a political party or to remain independent of politics. In the same year the party contested several municipal elections to no avail. A national level Agalev Working Group was founded to coordinate the new party. It also set up a separate association that could enter in elections. It participated in the 1979 European elections. Although the party won 2.3% of the votes, it won no seats.

In the 1981 election the party won 4% of vote and two seats in the Chamber of Representatives and one in the Senate. Ecolo, the Walloon green party also won two seats in the Chamber and three seats in the Senate. The political party Agalev was officially founded in 1982. It remained separate of the social movement. Prominent members of the movement Agalev, such as founder Versteylen chose not to join the political party Agalev. In the municipal elections of 1982 the party performed particularly well winning more than 10% in several municipalities. In its first periods in parliament the party functioned as a protest party forcing the other parties to take more action against environmental pollution and Third World poverty. The party campaigned on specific environmental issues, such as local anti-nuclear energy protests.

The party won two additional seats in the 1985 elections, two additional seats in 1987 and one in 1991: in that year it won seven seats in parliament. Agalev had become a serious political partner for other parties. In 1992 Agalev was asked to support a constitutional change called the Sint-Michiels accords, which would make Belgium a federation. Agalev gave its support in exchange of a tax on bottles, the first ecotax in Belgium. In the 1995 the party campaigned on a clean hands theme, after a series of political scandals was revealed. The party however lost two seats.

1999–now
In the 1999 elections Agalev and its Walloon sister party Ecolo performed exceptionally well. A scandal surrounding dioxine in for-consumption chickens just before the elections, played an important role in the party's performance. The party won 7,0% of vote and nearly doubled its seats from 5 to 9. The Greens joined the first cabinet Verhofstadt. The cabinet further consisted of the liberal Flemish Liberals and Democrats (VLD) and Reformist Movement (MR) and the socialist Different Socialist Party (SP.A) and Parti Socialiste (PS). The cabinet was called Purple-Green cabinet or the Rainbow cabinet, because of the many political colours in the coalition. Agalev supplied two ministers, Magda Aelvoet who became vice-prime minister and minister for Public health and the Environment, and Eddy Boutmans who became minister for Development Cooperation. The party also joined the Flemish Government, which was composed of the same Flemish parties Agalev, SP.A and VLD. Mieke Vogels became the Flemish minister for Wellbeing and Development Cooperation and Vera Dua became minister for Agriculture and the Environment.

On the national level, the greens, both Ecolo and Agalev were able to enact legislation on several key green issues: the cabinet decided to opt out of nuclear energy, it opened marriage to homosexuals, legalized several thousands of illegal foreigners, enacted an anti-discrimination law and promised to in time spend 0,7% of the national income on development aid. On the Flemish level organic agriculture was promoted, people with handicaps got personal budgets and a system of time credits was enacted to allow people to combine work, care and free time better. The party however faced several crises. Magda Aelvoet left the federal cabinet in August 2002 over a cabinet decision to trade arms with Nepal, which was at civil war at the time. She was replaced by Jef Tavernier. The Ecolo minister for mobility Isabelle Durant left the cabinet just before the elections over the issue of nighttime airplane flights over Brussels. Finally the party voted in favour of a new election law that enacted a 5% Election threshold in both the Senate and the Chamber.

The 2003 federal election formed a turning point for the party. The party was reduced to 2,6% of the vote, well below the 5% limit and the party lost its seats in the Chamber and Senate. In response to the election results the Flemish ministers Mieke Vogels and Vera Dua stepped down. They were replaced by Adelheid Byttebier and Ludo Sannen respectively. The party renewed is its political profile and made some important strategic decisions. Agalev would continue as an independent Flemish progressive Green party. The party congress rejected the proposal of Agalev-Limburg to form a federal cartel with the SP.A and Spirit. The party also ruled out any participation in the future Flemish Government. The party would allow provincial and municipal cartels. The party changed its name to Groen!. The party changed the function of political secretary to party president, bringing the party more in line with other Belgian parties. Vera Dua became the first party president. The decision to continue separately led to considerable upheaval within the party, several prominent members, such as Antwerpen councillor Fauzaya Talhaoui and Flemish minister Sannen left the party and joined either Spirit or SP.A. Sannen was replaced as minister by Tavernier.

Before the 2004 elections Dua announced that if the party was supported by less than 280.000 votes, the independent green political project would end. The party gained enough support to meet this limit, although it lost half of it seats in Flanders compared to the 2000 elections. The party won seats in every provincial district except Limburg, where the support to cooperate with SP.A and Spirit was greatest.

In the 10 June 2007 federal election, the party regained representation in both the Chamber and the Senate. It got 265,828 votes (4% of total) and four seats.

The regional (for Flemish Parliament) and European elections of June 2009 were generally devoted to promote the concept of a green economy as an answer to the national and global economic crisis. The results of the election were below the expected and stranded on a status quo. Chairwoman Mieke Vogels chose to give up her presidency and was succeeded by Wouter Van Besien in October 2009.

On 11 January the Party unveiled its new logo and announced the dropping of its trademark exclamation point from the end of the party's name, after 8 years of usage. The new party slogan is "Works for all" to highlight the party's desire to look after the needs of all of society, not just its traditional voter base.

2010 federal election

Party chairperson

Name
1982–2003: Agalev
2003–2012: Groen!
2012–present: Groen

The party was founded as Agalev, which meant Anders Gaan Leven (English: to start living differently). This conveyed the green message that humans need to choose alternative lifestyles that are more sustainable. When the party registered at the election authority, it was forced to supply a meaning for each initial. The party thus ran under the name Anders Gaan Arbeiden, Leven, En Vrijen (English: going to work, live and have sex differently), improvised and not entirely serious, but legally correct.

After the 2003 election defeat the party renewed its political profile. This also involved a name change to Groen! (English: Green!). The name conveyed a closer alliance to the worldwide green movement with the word green and an independent and positive nature with exclamation mark.

In January 2012 the party underwent another name change by removing the exclamation mark from the end of its name.

Ideology and issues

As a traditional green party, the three core values of Agalev were ecology, peace and participatory democracy. In the early years the party specifically sought to overcome traditional cleavages (liberal-socialist, Catholic-secular and Flemish-Belgian). Since the 1980s the ideals of diversity and social justice have also taken a prominent role. In its current political program it connected these three values by the concept of quality of life.

Representation
In this table the election results of Agalev/Groen!/Groen in House of Representatives, Senate and European elections is represented, as well as the results of regional elections for Flanders and Brussels. The party's political leadership is represented as well. If it was part of the governing federal coalition, then its minister is listed.

Members of the European Parliament
After the 2004 European Parliament elections, the party has one representative in the European Parliament: Bart Staes. The Green! delegation is part of The Greens–European Free Alliance group in the European Parliament. Together with the two MEPs of the Dutch GreenLeft he forms one transnational delegation.

Municipal government
Green! participates in several municipal governments. The party is especially strong in university cities like Leuven and Ghent.

Electorate

The support of Green! has strongly fluctuated recently. It draws most of its support from Flemish voters who do not feel bound to the strong social organizations and pillars. The party is strongest in urban areas with concentrated student populations like Ghent and Leuven.

Green!'s support is distributed in the following way between the electoral districts in the 2014 general election:

Electoral results

Chamber of Representatives

Senate

Regional

Brussels Parliament

Flemish Parliament

European Parliament

Elected politicians

Current

Provincial councilors
 2012 – 2018:
  Greet Bockx
  Tom Caals
  Koen Kerremans
  Diederik Vandendriessche
  Loes Van Cleemput
  Karin Van Hoffelen
  Yasmina Beldjoudi
  Inge De Bal
  Elisabet Dooms
  Jan Fiers
  Rik Franck
  Riet Gillis
  Stephan Boogaerts
  Luc Debraekeleer
  Luc Robijns
  Tie Roefs
  Sarah Sneyers
  Bernadette Stassens
  Erik Torbeyns
  Alex Colpaert
  Herman Lodewyckx
  Gerda Schotte
  Maarten Tavernier

Past
Chamber of Representatives
 1987 – 1991 (6):
 Jozef Cuyvers
 Wilfried De Vlieghere
 Jos Geysels
 Hugo Van Dienderen
 Wilfried Van Durme
 Mieke Vogels
 1991 – 1995 (7):
 Magda Aelvoet  → Lodewijk Steenwegen
 Luc Barbé
 Wilfried De Vlieghere
 Vera Dua 
 Jos Geysels 
 Hugo Van Dienderen
 Mieke Vogels  → Peter Luyten
 1995 – 1999 (5):
 Frans Lozie
 Jef Tavernier
 Hugo Van Dienderen
 Lode Vanoost
 Joos Wauters
 1999 – 2003 (9):
 Eddy Boutmans  → Leen Laenens
 Anne-Mie Descheemaeker
 Kristien Grauwels
 Simonne Leen
 Fauzaya Talhaoui
 Jef Tavernier  → Liliane De Cock
 Peter Vanhoutte
 Lode Vanoost
 Joos Wauters
 2007 – 2010 (4):
  Meyrem Almaci
  Wouter De Vriendt
   Tinne Van der Straeten
  Stefaan Van Hecke
 2010 – 2014 (5):
  Meyrem Almaci
  Eva Brems
  Kristof Calvo
  Wouter De Vriendt
  Stefaan Van Hecke

Brussels Parliament
 1989 – 1995 (1):
 Dolf Cauwelier
 1999 – 2004 (1):
 Adelheid Byttebier  → Anne Van Asbroeck (SP.A)
 2004 – 2009 (1):
 Adelheid Byttebier
 2009 – 2014 (2):
 Bruno De Lille  → Elke Van den Brandt
 Annemie Maes

European Parliament
 1984 – 1989 (1):
 Paul Staes
 1989 – 1994 (1):
 Paul Staes
 1994 – 1999 (1):
 Magda Aelvoet
 1999 – 2004 (2):
 Patsy Sörensen
 Bart Staes (left Spirit for Groen! in July 2002)
 Luckas Vander Taelen  → Jan Dhaene (left Groen! for SP.A in January 2004)
 2004 – 2009 (1):
 Bart Staes
 2009 – 2014 (1):
 Bart Staes

Flemish Parliament
 1995 – 1999 (7):
  Vera Dua
  Jos Geysels
  Johan Malcorps
  Ludo Sannen
  Jos Stassen
  Ria Van Den Heuvel
  Cecile Verwimp
 1999 – 2004 (12):
  Magda Aelvoet  → Ann De Martelaer
  Veerle Declercq
  Jos Geysels
  Eloi Glorieux
  Dirk Holemans
  Johan Malcorps
  Frans Ramon
  Ludo Sannen  → Flor Ory  → Ludo Sannen
  Jos Stassen
  Ria Van Den Heuvel
  Jo Vermeulen
  Vera Dua  → Isabel Vertriest  → Vera Dua
 2004 – 2009 (6):
  Rudi Daems
  Vera Dua
  Eloi Glorieux
  Jos Stassen
  Jef Tavernier
  Mieke Vogels
 2009 – 2014 (7):
  Bart Caron
  Elisabeth Meuleman
  Dirk Peeters
  Hermes Sanctorum
  Luckas Vander Taelen
  Mieke Vogels
  Filip Watteeuw 

Provincial councilors
1985 – 1991:
 Province of Brabant Johan Hamels
2006 – 2012:
  Rita Boden
  Ethel Brits
  Tom Caals
  Diederik Vandendriessche

Organization

Organizational structure
The highest organ of Green is the party congress, which is open to all members. The party has a relatively decentralized organization with strong municipal branches and a relatively small national organization. For a long time the party did not have a party president who set out the political strategy, but a party secretary with far less power. In 2003 the party changed this situation.

In contrast to other parties, Green MPs face relatively strong regulation: the party does not allow multiple offices per person, while it is traditional for Belgian MPs to be both mayor of municipality and federal MP for instance; furthermore MPs are not allowed to run for more than two terms; to ensure gender equality every second candidate on the party list has to be female; finally a high percentage of the income of MPs is taxed by the party.

By Belgian standards Green has relatively few members, ranging from 2,000 to 6,500. This is only about 1% of the Green voters. Generally Belgian parties have about 10% of their voter base as members.

The party's youth organization, Young Green (earlier Young Agalev), grew out of local groups of young Groen members, active since the late eighties and early nineties. These local groups started coordinated action in 1996. In 1998 Jong Groen was officially founded.

International organisations
Green is a member of the European Green Party and the Global Greens. The party hosted the founding congress of the European Federation of Green Parties.

Relationships to social organisations
Green is ideologically and historically linked to the environmental movement Agalev, which was founded by the Jesuit Luc Versteylen. The party and the social movement are separate entities. Green still has strong contacts with environmental organizations. It has not developed a pillar of social organizations around it as other parties have.

Relationships to other parties
The party has relatively good relations with the SP.A-SPIRIT cartel. It was asked to join them in 2003, but it refused. Furthermore, the party has maintained good relations with its Walloon sister party, Ecolo, with whom they form one group in the federal chamber of representatives.

International comparison
Internationally, Groen is comparable to the larger European Green parties, especially the German Alliance '90/The Greens, which has also been in government, although more successfully.

See also

Ecolo the Walloon (Francophone) green party
Green party
Green politics
List of environmental organizations

References

External links

Groen (Green)
Dossier Groen!—collection of news articles and video fragments at VRTnieuws.net (in Dutch)
Dossier Groen!—collection of newspaper articles and their results in the 2004 elections at De Standaard (in Dutch)

1982 establishments in Belgium
Political parties established in 1982
Green political parties in Belgium
Flemish political parties in Belgium
European Green Party
Global Greens member parties
Anderlecht
Pro-European political parties in Belgium